Aedes rusticus, it is a relatively common European mosquito, that is often responsible for human bites from May to August. Like all mosquitoes, it is only the females that bite.

Distribution
Aedes rusticus has a patchy distribution, from Britain (mainly southern), Belgium, Denmark, Poland, Russia, The Balkans and as far as Asia Minor.

Life cycle
Following a mammal blood meal to provide sufficient protein to produce eggs, females will lay their egg rafts in spring or summer in dried-up pools, they will hatch when the pools flood later in the year. They will overwinter in the 4th larval stage, pupation and adult emergence take place the following spring.

References

rusticus
Diptera of Asia
Diptera of Europe
Insects described in 1790
Taxa named by Pietro Rossi